{{Infobox law enforcement agency
| agencyname        = Republican National Guard
| nativename        = 
| commonname        = 
| abbreviation      = 
| fictional         = 
| patch             = 
| patchcaption      = 
| logo              = File:COA pt garde nationale républicaine.svg
| logocaption       = Coat of arms of the Guarda Nacional Republicana
| badge             = 
| badgecaption      = 
| flag              = 
| flagcaption       = 
| imagesize         = 
| motto             = Pela Lei e Pela Grei
| mottotranslated   = 
| formedmonthday    = 
| formedyear        = 
| preceding1        = 
| dissolved         = 
| superseding       = 
| employees         = 22,608
| volunteers        = 
| budget            = 
| legalpersonality  = 
| country           = Portugal
| countryabbr       = 
| national          = 
| federal           = 
| police            = 
| local             = 
| military          = 
| paramilitary      = 
| provost           = 
| gendarmerie       = yes
| religious         = 
| speciality1       = 
| speciality2       = 
| speciality3       = 
| speciality4       = 
| speciality5       = 
| secret            = 
| overviewtype      = 
| overviewbody      = 
| headquarters      = Quartel do Carmo, Lisbon
| electeetype       = 
| minister1name     = 
| minister1pfo      = 
| chief1name        = 
| chief1position    = 
| parentagency      = Ministry of the Internal Administration (in peacetime) Portuguese Armed Forces (in wartime)
| child1agency      = 
| person1name       = 
| person1reason     = 
| person1type       = 
| programme1        = 
| activity1name     = {{collapsible list |title=Overseas Deployment |Angola
 UNAVEM III 1995–96
 MONUA 1997–99
|East-Timor
 UNTAET 2000–02
 UNMISET 2002–03
 UNOTIL 2005–07
 UNMIT 2006–09
|DR Congo
 MONUC 2003–04
 EUPOL Kinshasa 2005–09
|Iraq IRAQ FREEDOM 2003–06 (within MSU)
|Republic of North Macedonia OSCE Skopje 2002–03
 EUPOL 2005
|Liberia UNMIL 2004–05
|Ivory Coast UNOCI 2004–05
|Haiti UNSTAMIH 2004–05
|Palestine EUPOL 2005–08
|Bosnia EUPM 2007–
 EUFOR Althea 2007–09
|Italy EUROGENDFOR 2005–11
|Kosovo EULEX 2008–09
|Georgia EUMM 2008–09>}}
| activitytype      = 
| anniversary1      = 
| award1            =  Officer Order of the Tower and Sword
| award2            =  Grand Cross Order of Christ
| award3            =  Member Order of Aviz
| award4            =  Member Order of Prince Henry
| award5            =  Member Order of Timor-Leste
| award6            =  Member Order of Liberty
| website           = 
| footnotes         = 
| reference         = 
}}
The National Republican Guard or GNR is the national gendarmerie force of Portugal.

Members of the GNR are military personnel, subject to military law and organisation, unlike the agents of the civilian Public Security Police (PSP).

The GNR is responsible for the preventive police and highway patrol in 94% of Portuguese territory. At national level, GNR also has duties of customs enforcement, coastal control, nature protection, search and rescue operations and state ceremonial guards of honor.

Since the 2000s, the GNR has provided detachments for participation in international operations in Iraq, East Timor and other theatres.

Strength

The GNR deploys over 22.608 personnel over 90 percent of Portuguese territory. The GNR are deployed in Bosnia as part of IFOR/SFOR/EUFOR Althea and 140 GNR were also deployed between 2006 and 2012 in Timor-Leste as part of UNMIT.

Organization

The National Republican Guard is in peacetime subordinate to the Ministry of Internal Administration for recruitment, administration, discipline and operational control and is also subordinate to the Ministry of National Defence for "uniformisation and normalisation" of military doctrine, armament and equipment. In wartime or situations of crisis, the GNR can be placed under the operational control of the Armed Forces General Staff.

Until 2007, the GNR maintained a traditional organization, whose bases still followed the organizational structure established in the early 20th century. This organization included: territorial units (four territorial brigades, that were designated "battalions" until 1993), special units (the Fiscal and the Traffic Brigades) and reserve units (the Cavalry and the Infantry regiments). The old organization also included a central structure that reflected the command of a military field division, including a military-type staff.

In 2006, the multinational consulting company Accenture made a study, requested by the Government of Portugal, that recommended the change of the organization of the Portuguese security forces, including a radical reorganization of the GNR.

Most of the recommendations regarding GNR were accepted and, in accordance with the Law No. 63/2007 (new Organic Law of the GNR), its traditional structure was replaced by a new and considerably different one, that was implemented in early 2009.

The GNR is commanded by a general officer, with the title of Commandant-General (Comandante-Geral).

The National Republican Guard now includes the following:

 Command Headquarters and HQ Services, NRG Source: GNR General Headquarters in Largo do Carmo, in Central Lisbon;
Reporting directly to the Commandant-General are the following:
Direção de Justiça e Disciplina (DJD, Directorate of Justice and Discipline);
Divisão de Planeamento Estratégico e Relações Internacionais (DPERI, Strategic Planning and International Relations Division);
Divisão de Comunicação e Relações Públicas (DCRP, Communications and Public Relations Division);
 Comando Operacional (CO, Operational Command);
 Comando da Administração dos Recursos internos (CARI, Command of the Administration of Internal Resources);
 Comando da Doutrina e Formação (CDF, Training and Doctrine Command).

Territorial Units
The old four-brigade structure was replaced by a system of territorial commands, each covering a district or an autonomous region. Each territorial command – commanded by a colonel or lieutenant colonel – includes detachments – commanded by majors, captains or junior officer, Sub-detachments – led by junior officers – and posts – led by sergeants. Each territorial command usually includes a traffic detachment (from the former Traffic Brigade) and a detachment of intervention. The territorial commands of the Azores and Madeira play, essentially, just a coastal monitoring and fiscal actions, respectively, under the functional dependence of the UCC and UAF. The current territorial commands correspond essentially to the previous territorial groups of the old territorial brigades. With the extinction of the territorial brigades by the end of 2008, the territorial commands were placed in direct dependence on the central structure of command of GNR;

The territorial commands are as follows:
 Azores Territorial Command (Comando Territorial dos Açores)
 Aveiro Territorial Command (Comando Territorial de Aveiro)
 Beja Territorial Command (Comando Territorial de Beja)
 Braga Territorial Command (Comando Territorial de Braga)
 Bragança Territorial Command (Comando Territorial de Bragança)
 Castelo Branco Territorial Command (Comando Territorial de Castelo Branco)
 Coimbra Territorial Command (Comando Territorial de Coimbra)
 Évora Territorial Command (Comando Territorial de Évora)
 Faro Territorial Command (Comando Territorial de Faro)
 Guarda Territorial Command (Comando Territorial da Guarda)
 Leiria Territorial Command (Comando Territorial de Leiria)
 Lisbon Territorial Command (Comando Territorial de Lisboa)
 Madeira Territorial Command (Comando Territorial da Madeira)
 Portalegre Territorial Command (Comando Territorial de Portalegre)
 Porto Territorial Command (Comando Territorial do Porto)
 Santarém Territorial Command (Comando Territorial de Santarém)
 Setúbal Territorial Command (Comando Territorial de Setúbal)
 Viseu Territorial Command (Comando Territorial de Viseu)
 Viana do Castelo Territorial Command (Comando Territorial de Viana do Castelo)
 Vila Real Territorial Command (Comando Territorial de Vila Real)

Special Units

Special Units fall directly under the Operations Command (Comando Operacional).

 Coastal Control Unit (Unidade de Controlo Costeiro, UCC) – Essentially a coast guard service but without dedicated Search & Rescue and other functions, is commanded by a major-general (or a rear-admiral, if a naval officer), is responsible for surveillance and interception at sea and coast, including the operation of the Integrated Surveillance, Command and Control System (SIVICC), distributed along the Portuguese coast. This unit replaced the former Maritime Service of the Fiscal Brigade ;
 Fiscal Action Unit (Unidade de Ação Fiscal, UAF) – commanded by a colonel, is responsible for carrying out the mission of taxation, tax and customs attributed to the GNR. It succeeded the previous Fiscal Brigade;
 National Transit Unit (Unidade Nacional de Trânsito, UNT) – the national Highway Patrol, is commanded by a colonel, is responsible for standardization of procedures and training under the supervision of traffic. This unit replaced the central structure of the former Traffic Brigade, losing its territorial subunits transit, which went to the dependence of the various command authorities;
 Security and State Honor Unit (Unidade de Segurança e Honras de Estado, USHE) – commanded by a major-general, is responsible for tasks of representation and security of the organs of sovereignty. Includes the Presidential Squadron (Esquadrão Presidencial), Horse Band (Charanga a Cavalo), the Guard Marching Band (Banda da Guarda), the State Honors and Security Group (Grupo de Segurança e Honras de Estado). This unit replaced the old Regimento de Cavalaria (Cavalry Regiment) and part of the old Regimento de Infantaria (Infantry Regiment);
 Intervention Unit (Unidade de Intervenção, UI) – commanded by a major-general, is responsible for the missions of maintaining and restoring public order, management of critical incidents, tactical operations, security of sensitive installations, inactivation of explosives, protection and relief and projection of forces for international missions. Includes the Public Order Intervention Group (Grupo de Intervenção de Ordem Pública, GIOP), the Special Operations Intervention Group (Grupo de Intervenção de Operações Especiais, GIOE), the Intervention Group for Protection and Rescue (Grupo de Intervenção de Proteção e Socorro, GIPS), the Canine Intervention Group (Grupo de Intervenção Cinotécnico, GIC), the Center for Ordnance Disposal and Underground Security (Centro de Inativação de Explosivos e Segurança em Subsolo, CIESS) and the International Missions Force Training and Readiness Centre (Centro de Treino e Aprontamento de Força para Missões Internacionais). This unit was organized with several subunits of the former Infantry Regiment.

Services
 Serviço de Protecção da Natureza e do Ambiente- SEPNA (Nature and Environment Protection Service)

Educational establishment

 NRG Basic School (Escola da Guarda, EG) – commanded by a major-general, is responsible for technical and professional training of military personnel of the GNR. Includes training centers in Figueira da Foz (CFFF) and Portalegre (CFP).

History

The National Republican Guard is the direct descendant of the Royal Police Guard created in the beginning of the 19th century.

Royal Guard of the Police, 1801

The Royal Guard of the Police of Lisbon (Guarda Real da Polícia de Lisboa) was created in 1801 by Prince Regent John on the initiative of the Intendant-General of the Police of the Court and the Kingdom, Pina Manique. It took as a model the French Gendarmerie (1791).

Following the creation of Lisbon's Royal Guard of the Police, a similar Guard was created in Porto. After the transfer of the Portuguese Court to Rio de Janeiro, after the invasion of Portugal by the Napoleonic forces in 1807, a similar Royal Guard of the Police of Rio de Janeiro was created, this being the origin of the present military police of that state and of the other member states of Brazil.

Municipal Guard, 1834
At the end of May, 1834, as a result of the Civil War, King Peter IV, assuming the regency in name of his daughter Queen Mary II, disbanded the Royal Police Guard in Lisbon and Porto, creating the "Municipal Guards" of Lisbon and Porto on the basis of similar conditions.

In 1868 both of the Guards were put under a unified Commandant-General, installed in the Carmo Barracks in Lisbon, which today still is the Headquarters of the GNR. The Municipal Guard was considered part of the Army, but was dependent on the Ministry of Internal Affairs for all matters regarding public security.

Republican Guard, 1910
After the 5 October 1910 revolution, which replaced the Constitutional Monarchy with the Republic, the new regime changed the name of the Municipal Guard to the Republican Guard (Guarda Republicana), keeping the same organization. At this time, plans were already underway for the transformation of this Guard into a National Republican Guard, covering all the territory of Portugal.

National Republican Guard, 1911
In 1911, the Republican Guard was transformed in the National Republican Guard (GNR): this was to be a security force consisting of military personnel organised in a special corps of troops depending, in peace time, on the Ministry of Internal Administration, for the purpose of conscription, administration and execution with regards to its mission, and the Ministry of the National Defense for the purpose of uniformization and normalization of the military doctrine, as well as for its armament and equipment. In case of war or situation of crisis, the forces of National Republican Guard will, in terms of the respective laws and for operational effect, be subordinated to the Commander-in-Chief of the Armed Forces.

In 1993 the National Republican Guard absorbed the independent Fiscal Guard (Guarda Fiscal) that became the Fiscal Brigade of the GNR. In 2006 a new GNR unit was created with the purpose of firefighting and was named GIPS.

A unit of the GNR was deployed in Iraq during the NATO mission MNF-I within the Italian led Multinational Specialized Unit.

A small contingent of GNR forces were deployed in Timor-Leste in 2006.

Awards and decorations1921: Awarded an exceptional move, the 3rd Battalion of the Fiscal Guard degree of Officer of the Order of the Tower and of the Sword, of Valour, Loyalty and Merit (by the action of this Battalion in Republican Revolt 31 January 1891, in the city. Porto). 1934: Order of the Tower and of the Sword, of Valour, Loyalty and Merit to the National Guard. 1965: Grand Cross of the Order of Christ the National Guard. 1984: Praise the Minister of Internal Affairs to the National Guard. 1985: Order of the Tower and of the Sword, of Valour, Loyalty and Merit the Fiscal Guard.1986: Honorary Member of the Military Order of Aviz the National Guard. 1988: Order of Christ the Fiscal Guard. 1990: Municipal Merit Medal, gold grade, Mayor of Lisbon, the Fiscal Guard. 1993: Medal Ensign Joaquim José da Silva Xavier, the Federal Military Police of the Brasilia National Guard. 1994: Gold Medal for Distinguished Service to the Public Safety Fiscal Guard.2004: Praise the Minister of Internal Affairs to the National Guard. 2005: Distinguished Service, with palm, the Subassemblies ALFA GNR (mission in Iraq).2006: Praise from the President to the Presidential Squadron, Cavalry Regiment of the GNR. 2006: title of honorary member of the Order of Prince Henry the Symphonic Band of the GNR. 2006: title of honorary member of the Order of Prince Henry the Cavalry Regiment of the GNR. 2008: Praise and gold medal for distinguished services, granted by the Minister of Internal Affairs, the Units of extinct GNR, namely: Territorial Brigade Nos. 2, 3, 4 and 5, Brigade Tax, Traffic Brigade, Infantry Regiment, and Cavalry. 2010: Praise the Minister of Internal Affairs to the National Guard. 2010: Title of honorary member of the Order of Prince Henry the National Guard. 2010: Order of Timor-Leste National Guard. 2011: Praise the Minister of Internal Affairs to the National Guard. 2011: Honorary Member of the Order of Liberty National Guard.

Ranks
Officers

Non-commissioned officers and enlisted

Equipment
Armament

Police services in Portugal have always used a wide range of firearms in 9×19mm to equip their personnel.

At the start of the 21st century they chose the Glock 19 as the standard law enforcement handgun, which came only to replace the old Walther PP and Walther P38. In recent years, new batches of Glock 19 pistols have been purchased in order to replace older pistol models, for example the Browning Hi-Power, Heckler & Koch P9S, Heckler & Koch VP70M, SIG Sauer P226, Walther P5 and Star Model B. Any other handgun in a caliber above .32 ACP will remain in service.

 Handguns
: Glock 17  (special operations)
 : Glock 19 - Standard issue sidearm
 : Heckler and Koch USP Compact (special operations)
 : SIG Sauer GSR - chambered in the .45 ACP
 : SIG Sauer SP 2022
 : Walther P99 (special operations)

 Shotguns
 : Fabarm SDASS Tactical
 : Benelli M3
 : Benelli M4

 Submachineguns
 : Brügger & Thomet MP9
 : FAMAE SAF
 : HK MP5A4, HK MP5K A1 (special operations)
 : Heckler & Koch MP7 (special operations)
 : Heckler & Koch UMP (special operations)Machine guns : Heckler & Koch MG4 (special operations)
 : FN MAG (special operations)
 : Browning M2 (special operations)
Rifles
 : H&K 416A5 (special operations)
: H&K 417A2 (special operations)
: H&K G28 (special operations)
: H&K G36C, G36KV (special operations)
 : H&K G3
 : MSG-90
: Brügger & Thomet APR (special operations)
 : Accuracy International AW50 (12.7×99mm) (special operations)Others : H&K GMG (special operations)
: Heckler & Koch AG36 (special operations)
: Taser X26
: Team Wendy Ballistic helmet
: Paraclete Bellator Ballistic shield
: NFM Group Mor Thor Bulletproof vest
: Flash-ball 44mm Less-lethal launcher
: Cougar 56mm Less-lethal launcher
ASP Street Defender Pepper spray
ASI 2000 Pepper spray

Vehicles
 Patrol cars
 Audi A4 B8 3.0 V6 (unmarked car, highway patrol)
 Audi TTRS 8S and Audi TT 8N (highway patrol)
BMW 535d (unmarked car, highway patrol)
BMW 5 Series (F10) (1 unit, special vehicle)
Citroën C-Elysée (527 units)
Lexus IS 220d (unmarked car, highway patrol)
Mitsubishi Lancer
Nissan Almera
Nissan GT-R (1 unit, special vehicle)
Porsche Panamera
 Skoda Octavia (hundreds of units)
Škoda Superb (99 units)
Subaru Impreza STI (some unmarked cars, highway patrol)
Toyota Avensis (hundreds of units)
 Toyota Corolla
Toyota Yaris
 Volkswagen Passat (hundreds of units)
Volkswagen SharanPatrol jeeps Audi Q7 (1 unit, special operations)
 BMW X6 (1 unit, special operations)
 Dacia Duster
 Land Rover Defender (hundreds of units)
 Mitsubishi L200
 Mitsubishi Outlander
 Mitsubishi Pajero
 Nissan Navara
 Nissan Patrol (hundreds of units)
Toyota Hilux 2.4D
Toyota Land Cruiser KDJ150L 3.0 D-4D (2 units, Serra da Estrela rescue unit)

Motorcycles
 BMW G310 GS 
 Honda ST1300
 Yamaha FJR1300

 Vans, trucks and buses
 Citroën Berlingo 1.6 BlueHDI 100cv (K-9 units)
Citroen Jumper 33 BlueHDi 130 
Fiat Ducato 2.3 Multijet 130cv (mobile station)
Volkswagen Crafter (1 unit, with coast radar)
Iveco Daily 50C18 (Command Post)
Iveco EuroCargo ML75E16 tow truck (4 units)
Iveco EuroCargo ML150E28 WM (8 units, with coast radar)
Iveco Eurotech 6x6 tow truck (3 units)
Iveco Trakker 330E5 (HAZMAT units)
 MAN TGM 13.290 4×4 BB
MAN TGS 35.460 8x8 BB
Mercedes-Benz Sprinter
 Mercedes-Benz Vito
Mitsubishi Fuso Canter FE74B 4X4
 Scania P230 (1 unit)
 Renault Kangoo
Renault Trafic (60 units)

 Armoured and water cannon vehicles 
 Iveco VM 90P Protetto (21 units, special operations)
MAN TGM 18.290 4X2 BL (1 unit)

 Bicycles
 Órbita GNR

 Boats
 Bojador-class offshore surveillance (1 unit)
Ribamar-class surveillance and interception boats (12 units)
 Zodíaco-class inland waters control boats (8 units)
High Speed Speedboat (5 units)Others'''

 Manitou MT625H Forklift
 MAN 18.370 HOCLA-II Bus
 Polaris RZR

Unmanned aerial vehicle 

 Tekever AR4 Light Ray
 UAVision SPYRO

See also
 Polícia de Segurança Pública - Portuguese police force
Polícia Judiciária - Portuguese criminal investigation police
Serviço de Estrangeiros e Fronteiras- Portuguese border and immigration police

References

External links

 

Military of Portugal
Gendarmerie
1834 establishments in Portugal
Law enforcement in Portugal